Sergei Aleksandrovich Temryukov (born 1 August 1978) is a Russian former professional footballer.

Career
Born in Yuzhno-Sakhalinsk, Temuryukov trained with the Russia national under-17 football team in Moscow. Shortly after, he joined PSV Eindhoven's youth academy at age 16. Eventually, Temuryukov started training with PSV's senior side and made a handful of Eredivisie appearances, becoming the first Russian to play for the club. He didn't play enough matches to receive a medal, but PSV twice won the league during Temuryukov's time at the club.

Temuryukov had a spell on loan at FC Dynamo Moscow, but it was cut short after he suffered a serious knee injury. With his chances at PSV limited, he signed for Eerste Divisie side FC Eindhoven.

References

External links

1978 births
Living people
People from Yuzhno-Sakhalinsk
Russian footballers
Association football defenders
Russia under-21 international footballers
Russian expatriate footballers
Expatriate footballers in the Netherlands
Expatriate footballers in Belarus
Eredivisie players
Eerste Divisie players
PSV Eindhoven players
FC Eindhoven players
FC Elista players
Kozakken Boys players
FC KAMAZ Naberezhnye Chelny players
FC Dinamo Minsk players
Belarusian Premier League players
FC Dynamo Moscow players
Sportspeople from Sakhalin Oblast